Shiu Ming-neng is a physician in the Republic of China. He was the Vice Minister of Health and Welfare in the Executive Yuan from 2013 to 2016.

Education
Shiu obtained his bachelor's degree in pharmacy from National Taiwan University (NTU) in 1983, master's degree in public health from NTU in 1998 and doctoral degree in epidemiology from NTU in 2002.

References

Living people
National Taiwan University alumni
National Yang-Ming University alumni
Year of birth missing (living people)
21st-century Taiwanese politicians